Bohoto Yeptho (born 25 December 1994) is an Indian cricketer. He made his first-class debut on 9 December 2019, for Nagaland in the 2019–20 Ranji Trophy.

References

External links
 

1994 births
Living people
Indian cricketers
Nagaland cricketers
Place of birth missing (living people)